Jaal is a 1986 Indian Hindi-language action film, produced by F.C. Mehra, Parvesh C. Mehra under the Eagle Films banner and directed by Umesh Mehra. It stars Rekha, Mithun Chakraborty, Mandakini, Moon Moon Sen and music composed by Anu Malik. The film was remade in Telugu as Kirai Dada (1987).

Plot
Shankar Verma (Mithun Chakraborty) lives a poor lifestyle with his mother, Shanti (Tanuja), after his father, Satpal Verma (Vinod Mehra) died many years ago. Before his death he was involved with a courtesan by the name of Meena Bai (Rekha). Now, Shankar finds himself the object of affection of two beautiful women, Sunita (Moon Moon Sen), a wealthy girl of Thakur Bhanupratap Singh and Madhu (Mandakini), a poor girl and lives with her parents, Hariya (Sharat Saxena) and Tara (Ila Arun). Both women think that Shankar is in love with them. Shankar is subsequently hired by a wealthy woman named Amita who wants him to spy on Thakur Bhanupratap (Amrit Pal), his sons Balram (Gulshan Grover), Jackie (Tej Sapru) & his partner Kedar (Roopesh Kumar). Shankar manages to become a driver in Thakur Bhanupratap household and goes about this task of spying and keeps reporting his findings to Amita regularly. One day while talking to villagers, he finds out that his father had a bad reputation and had not only betrayed the villagers, but had also killed Thakur Bhanupratap's younger brother, Shashipratap (Jeetendra). His inquiries take him to Central Jail, but on arrival, he is told by the jail superintendent that his father had finished serving his life sentence & was released & after his release had died just 6 months ago at the Brothel of Meena Bai. This was a surprise to Shankar as he & his mother Shanti had been under the impression that his father Satpal Verma had died much earlier many years ago. Shankar then sets out to find out the whereabouts of Meena Bai, but her brothel had caught fire & was destroyed and now no one knows her whereabouts. Little does Shankar know that Meena Bai is still alive in the shape and form of none other than Amita and is using Shankar as a tool to extract vengeance against Thakur Bhanupratap.

Cast

Rekha as Meena Bai / Sundari / Amita Singh 
Mithun Chakraborty as Shankar Verma 
Mandakini as  Madhu 
Moon Moon Sen as Sunita Singh 
Tanuja as Shanti Verma
Jeetendra as Chhote Thakur Shashipratap Singh 
Vinod Mehra as Satpal Verma 
Ila Arun as Tara
Sharat Saxena as Hariya
Amrit Pal as Bade Thakur Bhanupratap Singh
Gulshan Grover as Balram
Tej Sapru as Jackie
Roopesh Kumar as Kedar 
Jagdeep as Khatarnak Khan  
Mohan Choti as Khatarnak's Assistant 
Yunus Parvez as Milkman

Soundtrack

External links
 
 http://ibosnetwork.com/asp/filmbodetails.asp?id=Jaal+(1986)

References

1986 films
1980s Hindi-language films
Indian action films
Hindi films remade in other languages
Films scored by Anu Malik
Films directed by Umesh Mehra
1986 action films